Tomaž Lepša (born June 11, 1955) is a former Yugoslav ice hockey player. He played for the Yugoslavia men's national ice hockey team at the 1976 Winter Olympics in Innsbruck and the 1984 Winter Olympics in Sarajevo.

References

1955 births
Living people
Ice hockey players at the 1976 Winter Olympics
Ice hockey players at the 1984 Winter Olympics
Olympic ice hockey players of Yugoslavia
Sportspeople from Ljubljana
Slovenian ice hockey centres
Yugoslav ice hockey centres
HDD Olimpija Ljubljana players